The Harry E. Donnell House, also known as The Hill, is a historic 33-room Tudor Revival mansion located on the north shore of Long Island, at 71 Locust Lane, Eatons Neck, Suffolk County, New York. The mansion was constructed in June, 1902 and completed in January, 1903 by the Randall and Miller Company of Freeport, New York. When completed, the mansion had dual waterfronts. The east lawn extended from the mansion to Duck Island Harbor, and had sweeping views of Long Island Sound, while the south lawn extended to Northport Bay.

In 1927, the estate was subdivided, and the Eaton Harbors Corporation created to maintain the private roads and beaches for the new owners in the subdivision. During the Great Depression sales of building lots on the old estate moved slowly. In 1987, it was purchased by Robert Gerlach.

In 1997, the mansion was sold to the Carr family, who obtained the original architectural plans from Nicholas D. Ward and used them to restore the mansion to its original design and finish.

The Harry E. Donnell House was added to the National Register of Historic Places  in 1985.

References

External links
 Archiplanet.org listing for H.E. Donnell House (Archiplanet is a website that echoes National Register public domain data, and, in this case, added a photo too.)
 National Register of Historic Places in Suffolk County, New York (NRHP.com)
 Aerial Drone Video taken 2019

Houses on the National Register of Historic Places in New York (state)
Mansions of Gold Coast, Long Island
Huntington, New York
Houses completed in 1902
Houses in Suffolk County, New York
National Register of Historic Places in Suffolk County, New York
Gilded Age mansions
Tudor Revival architecture in New York (state)